Xintang is a metro station on Line 4 of the Hangzhou Metro in China. It is located in the Jianggan District of Hangzhou. This station was opened on June 28, 2015.

References

Railway stations in Zhejiang
Hangzhou Metro stations
Railway stations in China opened in 2015